Sierolomorpha canadensis is a species of sierolomorphid wasp in the family Sierolomorphidae.

References

Further reading

External links

 
 

Parasitic wasps
Insects described in 1888